McLaughlin Creek is a  stream that rises in a swampy area to the south of Buell Corners on the divide between Thompson Creek and East Branch of Oil Creek in Crawford County, Pennsylvania.

Variant names
According to the Geographic Names Information System, it has also been known historically as:  
Little Oil Creek

Course
McLaughlin Creek flows west from the swamp underneath PA 89 and then southwest around Fink and Gilson Ridges.  Once around the ridges, it turns south and rapidly falls through Bog Hollow to meet Thompson Creek at the bottom.  Bog Hollow marks the terminal moraine for glaciation.

References

Additional Maps

Rivers of Pennsylvania
Rivers of Crawford County, Pennsylvania